ShowBusiness: The Road to Broadway is a 2005 American documentary film, the first feature film directed by Dori Berinstein, a Broadway Producer, Writer and Filmmaker.  Berinstein completed the film in 2005.  The film premiered at the 2005 Tribeca Film Festival.  The film was named one of the top 5 films of 2006 by the IDA (International Documentary Association) and received the Grand Jury Prize for Best Documentary at the 2006 Florida Film Festival.  The film was released commercially in 2007, with the first such showings on 11 May 2007 in New York City.

Production
Berinstein filmed each principal musical on Broadway for her project during the 2003-2004 season, for about 600 hours of initial film footage.  She focused the film on four musicals, through the difficulties of pre-production, their openings, attendant publicity around the shows, and their reviews, through the 2004 Tony Award competition.  The four musicals, three of which were nominated for Best Musical in the Tony Awards that season, were:

 Wicked
 Taboo
 Caroline, or Change
 Avenue Q

The film climaxes with the 2004 Tony Awards ceremony at which Avenue Q won Best Musical over Wicked and Caroline, or Change. In addition to coverage of the musicals themselves, the movie includes interviews with New York theatre critics, and footage of several theatre critics discussing in a restaurant the various musicals and their predictions for the Tony Award winners.

Cast
 Alan Cumming
 Boy George
 Idina Menzel
 Rosie O'Donnell
 Kristin Chenoweth
 Raul Esparza
 Euan Morton
 George C. Wolfe
 Tonya Pinkins
 Robert Lopez
 Jeff Marx
 Tony Kushner
 Stephen Schwartz
 Stephanie D'Abruzzo

Reception

Critical response
On Rotten Tomatoes, the film holds an approval rating of 89% based on 54 reviews, with an average rating of 7.4/10. The website's critics consensus states: "Made with obvious care and attention, Showbusiness is an entertaining, insightful look into Broadway." Theatre critic Michael Riedel received harsh criticism from actors and songwriters who were subjects of the film, after seeing his comments in the film.

Release
ShowBusiness: The Road to Broadway premiered at the 2005 Tribeca Film Festival. The film was released on DVD on October 16, 2007 by Liberation Entertainment.

References

External links
"ShowBusiness: The Road to Broadway" Official Site
Internet Movie Database
Broadway Cares/Equity Fights AIDS
Theatermania Review by David Finkle
BroadwayWorld Photo Coverage
Slant Magazine Film Review
RottenTomatoes - ShowBusiness
The Numbers.com, page with box office data

2005 films
American independent films
Documentary films about Broadway theatre
American documentary films
2005 documentary films
2005 independent films
Films scored by Jeanine Tesori
2000s English-language films
2000s American films